Hungarian Reformed Church may refer to:

 Hungarian Reformed Communion, a communion of independent Reformed churches from several countries in Europe, with historical ties to the Reformed Church in the Kingdom of Hungary
 The contemporary Reformed Church in Hungary

See also 
 Reformation in the Kingdom of Hungary